Dolores Al Shelleh is an Emirati-based Jordanian-Serbian mountaineer and ESG Activist who currently lives in Dubai, UAE. She was the first woman from Jordan to summit the Mount Everest, which she achieved in 2019, a year which marked many deadly Mount Everest expeditions.

Career 
She successfully climbed Kilimanjaro in Africa, Mera Peak in Nepal, and Elbrus in Europe. She was the first Arab person to climb Mount Manaslu, which is located in the Himalayas.

In April 2019, she embarked her Everest expedition and she successfully climbed the Mount Everest on 23 May 2019, attempting from the Northeast ridge of Tibet. She became the first Jordanian woman and third Arab woman to achieve the feat. Dolores also became the first Arab woman to successfully climb Mount Everest from the Northeast ridge. She also filmed her journey to the Everest herself, and released it as a documentary titled The Lone She, which premiered on the National Geographic Abu Dhabi on 8 March 2020, coinciding with the International Women's Day.

She also works as an advocate with The Sustainable City to raise awareness regarding the Sustainable Development Goals implemented by the United Nations including the climate change.

References 

Living people
Summiters of Mount Everest
Jordanian activists
Serbian activists
Jordanian mountain climbers
Serbian mountain climbers
Jordanian expatriates in the United Arab Emirates
Year of birth missing (living people)